Sunni Cultural Center, Dubai, also called Markaz Dubai is a religious and cultural center of Markazu Saquafathi Sunniyya in Dubai, United Arab Emirates. Opened on April 22, 2010, under the supervision of the Islamic Affairs and Charitable Activities Department of Dubai, the center intendedly provides a variety of services to members of the Muslim community.

Information 
Markaz Dubai is an educational center for those who wish to increase their knowledge of Islamic principles and cultural values, and therefore intends to strengthen the social structure of the community. The center provides counselling and support in all areas of family life, including pre-marital and marital counselling, marital contracts, and parenting. The center also hosts charitable and social events, such as meetings and blood drives.

Founding members of the center include: Dr. Hamad Bin Al Shaikh Ahmad Al Shaibani, Director General of Islamic Affairs and Charitable Activities Department in Dubai, Sheikh Abubakr Ahmad, Chancellor of Markaz, Lt. Gen. Dhahi Khalfan Tamim, Head of General Security of Dubai, Dr. MAH Azhari Director General of Markaz, Dr. Omar Mohammed Al Khateeb Executive Director of the Islamic Affairs Sector, Dr. Adel Juma Matar, Head of the Islamic Institutions Department, and Mohammad Abdullah Al Haj Al Zarouni, Head of Emirates Red Crescent.

See also
 Knowledge City
 Markaz Arts and Science College
 Markaz Law College
 Shahre Mubarak Grand Masjid
Markazu Saquafathi Sunniyya

References 

Buildings and structures in Dubai
Islam in the United Arab Emirates
Religious buildings and structures in Dubai
Markaz